Pedro Manuel da Silva Moreira (born 15 March 1989) is a Portuguese professional footballer who plays as a midfielder for F.C. Arouca.

Club career

Boavista
Moreira was born in Lousada, Porto District. He made his Primeira Liga debut in 2007–08 with Boavista FC, his first match in the competition being on 16 December 2007 in a 2–0 home win against Associação Naval 1º de Maio where he came on as a last-minute substitute, also being booked; in spite of a 9th-place finish, the season ended in relegation due to the Apito Dourado affair.

Porto
In summer 2008, Moreira signed for FC Porto as a 19-year-old. He spent the next four years on loan in both the top division and the Segunda Liga, to Boavista, Gil Vicente F.C. (twice) and Portimonense SC.

From 2012 to 2014, Moreira competed with Porto's reserves in the second tier, where he acted as captain. In the latter campaign, he helped his team to finish second by contributing 38 appearances and four goals, but they were ineligible for promotion.

Rio Ave
Moreira was loaned to fellow top-flight club Rio Ave F.C. in June 2014. He totalled 41 games with four goals for the season, including seven to help his team to reach the group phase of the UEFA Europa League.

On 22 July 2015, Moreira joined Rio Ave on a permanent three-year contract.

Later career
Moreira agreed to a deal at FC Hermannstadt of the Romanian Liga I on 18 October 2018. He returned to Portugal in February 2020, signing with F.C. Arouca in the third tier and going on to achieve two promotions in as many years.

On 2 June 2022, aged 33, Moreira renewed his link at the Estádio Municipal de Arouca until 2024.

International career
Moreira won 39 caps for Portugal across all youth levels. His under-21 bow took place on 11 July 2009, in a 1–0 loss against Cape Verde in the Lusofonia Games.

References

External links

1989 births
Living people
People from Lousada
Sportspeople from Porto District
Portuguese footballers
Association football midfielders
Primeira Liga players
Liga Portugal 2 players
Campeonato de Portugal (league) players
Boavista F.C. players
FC Porto players
Gil Vicente F.C. players
Portimonense S.C. players
FC Porto B players
Rio Ave F.C. players
F.C. Arouca players
Liga I players
FC Hermannstadt players
Portugal youth international footballers
Portugal under-21 international footballers
Portuguese expatriate footballers
Expatriate footballers in Romania
Portuguese expatriate sportspeople in Romania